A railway infrastructure manager is a rail transport company or body of other type, responsible for maintaining railway infrastructure. The European Union defines it as "any body or undertaking that is responsible in particular for establishing and maintaining railway infrastructure. This may also include the management of infrastructure control and safety systems. The functions of the infrastructure manager on a network or part of a network may be allocated to different bodies or undertakings" This includes mainly railway track and catenary, if the railway line is electrified, and respective command and control systems. It can also include the stations and power supply network. A significant proportion of these companies are state-owned monopolies, responsible for all or most of the railway infrastructure within a given country. 

Ownership and operation of these two components varies by location. In some places (notably, most of North America) private railway companies own and operate both the infrastructure and rolling stock (for example, Union Pacific). In the United Kingdom, the infrastructure is owned and maintained by Network Rail while rolling stock is largely owned and operated by private railway companies. In countries with nationalized rail systems such as China, both the infrastructure and rolling stock are owned and operated directly or indirectly by the national government. In the European Union (EU), separation of infrastructure and operation is mandated by law, so train operation is performed by another type of company, a railway undertaking which must be provided with non-discriminatory access to any railway path within the EU. Outside the European Union it is possible that the same company is owning the infrastructure and also operating trains and in that case this designation might not make sense. Infrastructure managers charge for the use of its network.

Management of railway infrastructure

Operation
The operation of the railway is through a system of control, originally by mechanical means, but nowadays more usually electronic and computerized.

Signalling 

Signalling systems used to control the movement of traffic may be either of fixed block or moving block variety.

Fixed block signalling

Most blocks are 'fixed' blocks, i.e. they delineate a section of track between two defined points. On timetable, train order, and token-based systems, blocks usually start and end at selected stations. On signalling-based systems, blocks usually start and end at signals. Alternatively, cab signalling may be in use.

The lengths of blocks are designed to allow trains to operate as frequently as necessary. A lightly used branch line might have blocks many kilometres long, whilst a busy commuter railway might have blocks a few hundred metres long.

Moving block signalling

A disadvantage of fixed blocks is that the faster trains are permitted to run, the longer the stopping distance, and therefore the longer the blocks need to be. This decreases a line's capacity.

With moving block, computers are used to calculate a 'safe zone', behind each moving train, which no other train may enter. The system depends on precise knowledge of where each train is and how fast it is moving. With moving block, lineside signals are not provided, and instructions are passed direct to the trains. It has the advantage of increasing track capacity by allowing trains to run much closer together. The system is only used on very few independent networks such as underground lines.

Types of rail system
Most rail systems serve a number of functions on the same track, carrying local, long-distance and commuter passenger trains, and freight trains. The emphasis on each varies by country. Some urban rail transit, rapid transit and light rail systems are isolated from the national system in the cities they serve. Some freight lines serving mines are also isolated, and these are usually owned by the mine company. An industrial railway is a specialized rail system used inside factories or mines. Steep grade railways are usually isolated, with special safety systems.

Permanent way and railroad construction

The permanent way trails through the physical geography. The tracks' geometry is limited by the physical geography.

Maintenance of way operations

The presence of a work train on a given section of track will temporarily decrease the capacity of the route. The normal method in such operations is to cease other traffic altogether during the track 'occupation'. Services may be diverted by an alternative route, if available; alternatively, passenger services may be maintained using a replacement bus service. It is therefore more economically viable to plan such track occupations for periods of reduced usage (e.g. 'off-peak', overnight or holiday times) to minimise the impact on normal services and revenue.

Feasibility factors

Each transport system represents a contribution to a country's infrastructure, and as such must make economic sense or eventually close. From this, each has a particular role or roles. These may change with time but they affect the specifications of each particular system. Rail transport systems are built into the landscape, including both the physical geography (hills, valleys, etc.) and the human geography (location of settlements). The rail transport system may in turn feedback into the human geography.

Physical geography
The permanent way of a system must pass through the geography and geology of its region. This may be flat or mountainous, may include obstacles such as water and mountains. These determine, in part, the intrinsic nature of the system. The slope at which trains run must also be calculated correctly. In this stage, it is decided where tunnels pass.

Human geography
Rail transport systems affect the human geography. Large cities (such as Nairobi) may be founded by a railroad passing through. Historically, when a station has been built outside the town or city it is intended to serve, that town has expanded to include the station, or buildings (especially Inns) sprung up near the station. The existence of a station may increase the number of commuters who live in a town or village and so cause it to become a dormitory town. The transcontinental railroad was a large factor in American colonization of the Western frontier. China's railroad expansion into Tibet may have similar consequences.

Historical factors
Rail transport systems are often used for purposes they were not designed for, but have evolved into due to changes in human geography. Politics can play a large part in decisions about railways, such as the Beeching Axe. In the UK, building or rebuilding a railway usually requires an Act of Parliament. In many countries, rail subsidies allow unprofitable, but socially desirable, railways to continue to operate.

References 

Railway infrastructure managers